Ministry of Industry and Trade is the ministry that is responsible for industry and trade in Somalia.

References

Government of Somalia